The 1993–94 Algerian Championnat National was the 32nd season of the Algerian Championnat National since its establishment in 1962. A total of 16 teams contested the league, with MC Oran as the defending champions, The Championnat started on November 18, 1993. and ended on June 16, 1994.

Team summaries

Promotion and relegation 
Teams promoted from Algerian Division 2 1993–1994 
 CS Constantine
 GC Mascara
 ASO Chlef

Teams relegated to Algerian Division 2 1994–1995
 WA Mostaganem
 ES Sétif
 USM Bel-Abbès

League table

References

External links
1993–94 Algerian Championnat National

Algerian Championnat National
Championnat National
Algerian Ligue Professionnelle 1 seasons